Audrey Elizabeth Luna (born in Salem, Oregon) is an American soprano who won a Grammy Award in 2014 for Best Opera Recording of Thomas Adès's opera The Tempest and is the record holder for singing the highest written note at the Metropolitan Opera. Luna regularly performs on stages in America and Europe, including the Metropolitan Opera, Vienna State Opera, Royal Opera House, Houston Grand Opera, Teatro La Fenice, Lyric Opera of Chicago, Den Norske Opera, Pittsburgh Opera, and Opéra de Montréal.

Career
Luna made her debut at the Metropolitan Opera as the Queen of the Night in Julie Taymor's production of The Magic Flute, and continued with roles such as Najade in Ariadne auf Naxos, Fiakermilli in Arabella, and Olympia in The Tales of Hoffmann.

About her performance of Ariel in The Tempest at the Metropolitan Opera, The New York Times said, "Mr. Adès's Ariel is a dazzling creation, and Ms. Luna conquers the role."

The Calder Quartet and Luna toured Europe in 2016 with Péter Eötvös's song cycle The Sirens.

In 2017, Luna set the record for singing the highest written note on the Metropolitan Opera stage, A6, during the American premiere production of Thomas Adès' new opera The Exterminating Angel; Luna was part of that opera's world premiere at the Salzburg Festival in 2016, and a production by the Royal Opera House, London, in 2017.

Other roles in Luna's repertoire include Zerbinetta in Ariadne auf Naxos, the title role in Lucia di Lammermoor, Madame Mao in Nixon in China, Gilda in Rigoletto, the title role in Lakmé, and Chief of Gepopo in Le Grand Macabre. The 2017/18 season marks her role debuts as Norina in Don Pasquale, and Marie in La fille du régiment.

Luna has appeared on the concert stage with Berlin Philharmonic, London Symphony Orchestra, New York Philharmonic, Los Angeles Philharmonic, San Francisco Symphony, Minnesota Orchestra, Seattle Symphony, and others. Her repertoire for the concert stage includes Brahms' Requiem, Carl Orff's Carmina Burana, Handel's Messiah, Unsuk Chin's Cantatrix Sopranica, Makris' Symphony for Soprano and Strings, Vivaldi's Gloria, Ligeti's Requiem and Le Grand Macabre, George Crumb's Star-Child, Amy Beach's Grand Mass, and Debussy's Le Martyre de saint Sébastien.

Discography
Thomas Adès, The Tempest, Deutsche Grammophon DVD – Awards: Diapason d'Or, Grammy Award for Best Opera Recording
Péter Eötvös, The Sirens, with Calder Quartet, BMC Records CD

References

External links

Profile, Barrett Artists

Year of birth missing (living people)
American operatic sopranos
Musicians from Salem, Oregon
Singers from Oregon
21st-century American women opera singers
Living people
Grammy Award winners
American people of Ecuadorian descent
Portland State University alumni
University of Cincinnati – College-Conservatory of Music alumni
Classical musicians from Oregon